is a Japanese Nippon Professional Baseball player for the Chiba Lotte Marines of Japan's Pacific League.

Notes and references

External links

1976 births
Chiba Lotte Marines players
Japanese baseball players
Living people
Nippon Professional Baseball outfielders
Sportspeople from Okayama
Yomiuri Giants players
Japanese baseball coaches
Nippon Professional Baseball coaches